The right triangular ligament is situated at the right extremity of the bare area, and is a small fold which passes to the diaphragm, being formed by the apposition of the upper and lower layers of the coronary ligament.

Additional images

References

External links
 

Ligaments of the torso
Liver anatomy